Ewout Irrgang (born 20 July 1976 in Utrecht) is a former Dutch politician, anti-globalization activist and banking employee. As a member of the Socialist Party (Socialistische Partij) he was an MP from 6 October 2005 to 19 September 2012. He focused on matters of finance, development aid and globalization.

Irrgang studied political science at VU University Amsterdam and economics at the University of Amsterdam. He is the founder and head of the New Republican Society.

References 
  Parlement.com biography

1976 births
Living people
Anti-globalization activists
Dutch economists
Dutch political scientists
Dutch republicans
Members of the House of Representatives (Netherlands)
Politicians from Utrecht (city)
Socialist Party (Netherlands) politicians
University of Amsterdam alumni
Vrije Universiteit Amsterdam alumni
21st-century Dutch politicians